Gali Municipality is an administrative territorial entity of the Georgian Autonomous Republic of Abkhazia. The capital of the district is the town of Gali. The Gali Municipality has boundaries with Ochamchire Municipality of Autonomous Republic of Abkhazia and Zugdidi Municipality of Samegrelo-Zemo Svaneti.

References

Districts of Georgia (country)